is a sub-kilometer asteroid, classified as near-Earth object and potentially hazardous asteroid of the Apollo group. It led the impact hazard list, with a Torino Scale impact risk value of 1, for one week, ending on February 19, 2007. Before and after , 99942 Apophis was the object with the highest Palermo Scale rating. With an observation arc of 4.8 days, it had a Palermo Scale of −0.88.

 was discovered on February 11, 2007, by the Catalina Sky Survey at the University of University of Arizona. The object is estimated at 966 metres in diameter with a mass of a 1.2x1012 kg.  Until February 15, it had an impact probability of 1/625000 for the day March 14, 2012. Additional observations through February 19 decreased the impact probability to ~1 in 300 million, making it of negligible concern. It was removed from the Sentry Risk Table on February 22, 2007.

See also 
 List of exceptional asteroids
 Asteroid impact avoidance
 Asteroid naming conventions

References

External links 
 
 
 

481482
481482
481482
20070211